Duart may refer to:

 Duart Castle, on the Island of Mull, Scotland
 Duart, Ontario, a village in southern Ontario, Canada named for the castle
 Louise DuArt (born 1950), American comedian and impersonator
 DuArt Film and Video, American film and recording studio
 dual Universal asynchronous receiver/transmitter, in computers

See also
 Maclean of Duart, the main sept of the Scottish Clan Maclean
 Duarte (disambiguation)